Trantlemore is a small remote linear crofting township, lying on the left bank of the River Halladale, in Eastern Sutherland, Scottish Highlands and is in the Scottish council area of Highland.

The A897 road runs past Trantlemore.

Populated places in Sutherland